Lynx Lake may refer to several lakes in North America:

In the United States
Lynx Lake (Arizona)
Lynx Lake (Alaska)
In Canada
Lynx Lake (Manitoba)
Lynx Lake (Northwest Territories)